Hovenia dulcis, the Japanese raisin tree or oriental raisin tree, is a hardy tree found in Asia, from Eastern China (萬壽果; pinyin: wànshòuguǒ) and Korea (헛개나무, heotgae namu) to the Himalayas (up to altitudes of 2,000 m), growing preferably in a sunny position on moist sandy or loamy soils. The tree known for its health benefits when consumed in tea, introduced as an ornamental tree to several countries, also bears edible fruit. It is considered to be one of the most pervasive invaders in Brazilian subtropical forests.

Description 

Tree, rarely a shrub, deciduous, to 10–30 m tall. Branchlets brown or black-purple, glabrous, with inconspicuous lenticels. The glossy leaves are large and pointed. The trees bear clusters of small cream-coloured hermaphroditic flowers in July. The drupes appear at the ends of edible fleshy fruit stalks (rachis), which is a type of accessory fruit.

Uses 
The fleshy rachis of the infructescence is sweet, fragrant and is edible raw or cooked. Dried, they look and taste like raisins. An extract of the seeds, bough and young leaves can be used as a substitute for honey and is used for making wine and candy.

An extract of the leaves contains hodulcine, a glycoside which exhibits an anti-sweet activity.

The timber is fine and hard and is used for building construction and fine furniture.

It has been used in traditional Chinese, Korean, and Japanese medicines to treat fever, parasitic infection, as a laxative, and a treatment of liver diseases, and as a hangover treatment.

Reforestation 
In Thailand Hovenia dulcis is relatively rare, typically found in the stream-irrigated valleys of primary lower mountain evergreen forest located between 1,075 and 1,250 metres above sea level. However, it is one of 30 potential species identified as a substitute for Eucalyptus spp., commonly planted for reforestation, that would meet the demand for rapid growth while not disturbing the ecological balance.

In Thailand Hovenia dulcis grows at roughly the same rate as eucalyptus, reaching six metres in height within three years. One major asset is that the growth form of the tree allows other species to regenerate nearby. As well, the tree attracts several varieties of both birds and mammals which feed on the seeds and fruit. As well as promoting fauna diversity, this process assists in improving soil fertility through humification.

Synonyms 
 Hovenia acerba – Lindl.
 Hovenia inequalis – DC.

See also
Exocarpos cupressiformis

Gallery

References

Further reading
 
 
 Fang, Hsun-Lang; Lin, Hui-Yi; Chan, Ming-Che; Lin, Wei-Li and Lin, Wen-Chuan. "Treatment of chronic liver injuries in mice by oral administration of ethanolic extract of the fruit of Hovenia dulcis. American Journal of Chinese Medicine 35.4 (2007): 693-703.
 Koller, G.L. and Alexander, J.H. "The raisin tree: Its use, hardiness and size."Arnoldia 39.1 (Jan/Feb 1979): 6-15.

External links

 Flora of China

Rhamnaceae